Lucas Martello Felippe Nascimento (born 3 May 2000) is a Brazilian professional footballer who plays as a midfielder for Italian  club Giugliano.

Club career
On 1 February 2019, Felippe signed a professional contract with Hellas Verona until 2022. He made his professional debut with Hellas Verona in a 2–0 Serie A loss to Brescia on 5 July 2020.

On 5 October 2020, he joined Serie C club Mantova on loan.

On 2 August 2021, he joined Portuguese side Farense on permanent basis.

Personal life
Felippe was born in Brazil, and is of Italian and Spanish descent. He holds Spanish nationality.

References

External links

Serie A Profile

2000 births
Living people
Footballers from São Paulo
Brazilian footballers
Spanish footballers
Brazilian people of Spanish descent
Brazilian people of Italian descent
Spanish people of Italian descent
Association football forwards
Hellas Verona F.C. players
Mantova 1911 players
S.C. Farense players
S.S.C. Giugliano players
Serie A players
Serie C players
Brazilian expatriate footballers
Expatriate footballers in Italy
Brazilian expatriate sportspeople in Italy
Expatriate footballers in Portugal
Brazilian expatriate sportspeople in Portugal